Sean Cronin (born 1964) is an English actor and director. Cronin is best known for playing villains. He is of Italian and Spanish descent.

Career

Cronin was vocalist for the gothic rock band The Marionettes, which formed in 1986 and toured with bands such as Pearl Jam and Nirvana The band released four albums between 1990 and 1998. In 1999, Cronin began his acting career playing a High Priest in The Mummy. He subsequently had small roles in The World Is Not Enough and Harry Potter and the Chamber of Secrets. In 2015 he played a villain in Mission: Impossible – Rogue Nation. He also appeared as Max, one of the villainous Ferrino brothers (along with Bruce Payne as Ray), in The Antwerp Dolls. In 2016 he played the eponymous villain in Kill Kane, opposite Vinnie Jones. He has also been cast in Fantastic Beasts and Where to Find Them, based on J. K. Rowling's novel Fantastic Beasts and Where to Find Them, and sequel of the Finnish superhero film, Rendel 2: Cycle of Revenge.

Cronin's first directorial film was Escape to Gossau, which he co-directed with Michael Koltes. Cronin subsequently directed Give Them Wings, which focuses on the life of disabled writer Paul Hodgson. He is also set to direct Michael, a biopic of boxer Michael Watson.

Filmography

Film
As actor

As Director

Music Videos

TV appearances 
As actor

As director

References

External links
 

English male film actors
English male television actors
Living people
20th-century English male actors
21st-century English male actors
1964 births